The Leeds municipal elections were held on Thursday 10 May 1962, with one third of the council to be elected.

Both Labour and Conservative took hits to their vote (although falling more at the Conservative's expense meant a 1.7% swing to Labour) as the Liberals received record support, more than doubling contemporary results to surpass the 10,000 marker in votes and obtaining a double-figure vote share for the first time. Unable to add to the gains they were making across England and Wales that night, they won second-place in the majority of the ten wards they fought - although most looked unlikely to pay much dividend, simply pipping Labour to distant second-place in safe-Conservative seats. The closest races - offering some prospect of success for them - were found in Far Headingley where they managed a swing of just under 11% to wipe away two-thirds of the Tory majority, and achieving an even larger swing of 14% to turn Stanningley into a Labour-held three-way marginal.

The Liberals weren't alone in fielding their greatest number of candidates, as the Communists matched their 1950 record of seven candidates, surpassing one percent for the first time (beyond 1950). Despite these advances, the only change was to be found in the Conservative-Labour battleground of Wortley, with Labour gaining the seat by a mere three votes. Turnout fell modestly to 33.9% on the previous year.

Election result

The result had the following consequences for the total number of seats on the council after the elections:

Ward results

References

1962 English local elections
1962
1960s in Leeds